Hesperia metea, the cobweb skipper, is a butterfly of the family Hesperiidae. It has a scattered distribution in the United States from southern Maine west to Wisconsin, south to central Georgia, the Gulf States and central Texas.

The wingspan is 29–35 mm. There is one generation with adults on wing from late March to early June.

The larvae feed on various grasses, including Schizachyrium scoparium and Andropogon gerardi. Adults feed on flower nectar from various low-growing plants, including Labrador tea, wild strawberry, blackberry, bird's-foot violet, winter cress, red clover, lilac, vervain, Carolina larkspur and wild hyacinth.

Subspecies
Hesperia metea metea  (Scudder, 1864) 
Hesperia metea intermedia  (Gatrelle)  - southern cobweb skipper
Hesperia metea licinus  (Edwards, 1871) - Licinus cobweb skipper

References

External links
Butterflies and Moths of North America

Hesperia (butterfly)
Butterflies described in 1863
Butterflies of North America